Akko Light or Acre Light, is an active lighthouse in the port of Acre, Israel. It is located on the South-West corner of the city's ancient walls, at what is believed to be the former site of an Ottoman Burj-El-Sanjak (Flag Tower).

History
The station was established in 1864. As charts of the area were based on measures from 1862, the French navy chart of 1866 does not mentioned it, and it only appeared later on amended charts. The current structure was established in 1912.

Structure and display
The main structure is a  tapering cylindrical concrete tower with four ribs. It is painted in a black and white checkered pattern and topped with a gray metallic lantern room and a gallery. A small white painted equipment shack stands next to the tower.

The lighthouse is closed to the public, but there is a stone stairwell going down from the base directly into the sea.

See also

 List of lighthouses in Israel

References

Lighthouses completed in 1864
Lighthouses completed in 1912
Lighthouses in Israel
Light
1912 establishments in the Ottoman Empire